Algeria competed in the 2012 Summer Paralympics in London, United Kingdom, from 29 August to 9 September 2012.
33 competitors participate at the 2012 Paralympics with 26 men and 7 women are accompanied by managers, coaches and other support staff.

Competitors

* There is one man competitor who participate in Athletics and Goalball, so number of men competitors is 26 not 27.

Medallists

Athletics
Abdellatif Baka won a gold medal for Algeria in the Men's 800m T13 event on September 6.  The next day, Lynda Hamri won a silver for Algeria in the Women's Long Jump F13 event. Lahouari Bahlaz also won a bronze in the Men's Discus F32/33/34 event.

| width="20%" align="left" valign="top" style="font-size:85%;" |

Key1
WR = World record
PR = Paralympic record
AF = African record
RR = Regional record
NR = National record
SB = Seasonal best record
PB = Personal best record

| width="80%" align="left" valign="top" style="font-size:85%;" |

Key2
Note–Ranks given for preliminary rounds are within the athlete's heat only
Q = Qualified for the next round
q = Qualified for the next round as a fastest loser or by position without achieving the qualifying target
N/A = Round not applicable for the event
Bye = Athlete not required to compete in round

Men–track

Men–field

Women–track

Women–field

Goalball

Men's tournament

Roster
Firas Bentria
Abdelhalim Larbi
Imad Eddine Godmane
Mohamed Ouali
Mohamed Mokrane
Ishak Boutaleb

Group B

Quarter-final

Judo

Men

Women

Powerlifting

Men

See also
Algeria at the 2012 Summer Olympics

References

External links
Algeria profile - london2012.com

Nations at the 2012 Summer Paralympics
2012
Summer Paralympics